Barbecue in Missouri may refer to two distinct styles of preparation:
 Kansas City-style barbecue, typically associated with Kansas City, Missouri, and its surroundings
 St. Louis-style barbecue, typically associated with St. Louis, Missouri, and its surroundings